Microsoft Home was a line of software applications and personal hardware products published by Microsoft. Microsoft Home software titles first appeared in the middle of 1993. These applications were designed to bring multimedia to Microsoft Windows and Macintosh personal computers. With more than 60 products available under the Microsoft Home brand by 1994, the company's push into the consumer market took off. Microsoft Plus!, an add-on enhancement package for Windows, continued until the Windows XP era. The range of home software catered for many different consumer interests from gaming with Microsoft Arcade and Entertainment Packs to reference titles such as Microsoft Encarta, Bookshelf and Cinemania. Shortly after the release of Microsoft Windows 95, the company began to reduce the price of Microsoft Home products and by the rise of the World Wide Web by 1998, Microsoft began to phase out the line of software.

Titles 
Microsoft Home produced software for all different home uses and environments. The products are divided into five categories: Reference & Exploration, Entertainment, Kids, Home Productivity and Sounds, and Sights & Gear. The category in which the product was divided is identifiable by the packaging. Generally, Reference & Exploration products have a purple base color, Entertainment has a black base color, Kids has a yellow base color, Home Productivity has a green color and Sounds, Sights & Gear products have a grey or red base color. Note that many applications were developed in conjunction with other reputable software and reference companies. For example, Microsoft Musical Instruments was developed with Dorling Kindersley.

Reference and exploration software 
Microsoft Home Reference products brought information to Multimedia Personal Computers - it was an effective way of presenting and exploring information before the World Wide Web became mainstream. These products were embellished with hyperlink navigation systems, which were relatively new at this time. Most of these products were released on CD-ROM, giving the software the ability to display high-resolution graphics and animations, and play high-quality waveforms and MIDI files. These products proved that personal computers would revolutionize the way that we find and explore information.

Entertainment
In the early 1990s, games on personal computers generally ran on the now obsolete MS-DOS operating system. However, with the introduction of Microsoft Windows 3.1x in 1992, Microsoft Home published several entertainment applications that implemented the new technologies of Microsoft Windows such as DirectX. Furthermore, these applications encouraged the computer gamers of the time to migrate from MS-DOS to Microsoft Windows. This transition permitted better use of computer graphics, revolutionized game programming and resulted in a more realistic gaming experience, compared to DOS gaming. For example, Microsoft Windows Entertainment Pack Games have remained a classic for computer gamers, ever since their development in the early 1990s.

Kids

The Microsoft Kids division produced educational software aimed at children in 1993. Their products feature a purple-skinned character named McZee who wears wacky attire and leads children through the fictional town of Imaginopolis, where each building or room is a unique interface to a different part of the software.  He is accompanied by a different partner in each software title.

Tying in with the TV series, Microsoft Scholastic's The Magic School Bus was a highly successful series that continued to be sold after Microsoft Home's kids range of software turned into a subsidiary called Microsoft Kids.

Home productivity software

Sights, Sounds & Gear

Legacy

Current products
 Microsoft Publisher is still available even today as a part of Microsoft Office.
 Microsoft Flight Simulator development was discontinued with the closure of ACES Game Studio. A replacement, Microsoft Flight, was later developed but subsequently also discontinued. However, the last version of the original software was later made available via Steam. In 2020, a brand-new Flight Simulator version was released with updated DirectX graphics technology.
 Microsoft Picture It! eventually became Microsoft Digital Image and was discontinued after the release of Windows Vista. Windows Photo Gallery, itself later discontinued, and its successor Photos include similar features.

Discontinued products
 Microsoft AutoMap later became Microsoft MapPoint and Microsoft Streets & Trips. This can be confirmed by "AutoMap" registry entries installed by these products. Both were discontinued in 2014.
 Microsoft Works was replaced by Office Starter 2010 which is available to OEMs for installation on new PCs only and does not include a replacement for the Works Database program. Office Starter 2010 was discontinued before Office 2013, which does not offer a similar edition, was released.
 Microsoft Encarta and Microsoft Money  were discontinued in 2009, and no replacement products have been announced or released.

References

 Microsoft Home Software Catalog Winter/Spring 1995 (from Microsoft The Ultimate Frank Lloyd Wright) 1194 Part No. 098-56862
 Microsoft Knowledge Base

Home
Microsoft franchises